Palra is a village in the Gurgaon district of Haryana, India. It has a population of about 2803 persons living in around 507 households

It is located from its state main city Chandigarh. It lies near 68, 70A and 77 sectors of Gurgaon.

Villages near Palra, with distance, are Teekli, Darbaripur, Aklimpur, Sakatpur, Badshahpur, Shikohpur, Kherki Daula, Bhondsi.

Palra made history when Anup Kumar, a member of the India national kabaddi team, won gold medal in 2010 Asian Games.

References 

Villages in Gurgaon district